Ídolos Brazil 6, also taglined as Ídolos 2011 is the sixth season of Brazilian reality interactive talent show Ídolos and fourth season aired on Rede Record. It premiered on Tuesday, April 5, 2011.

Rodrigo Faro returned as a host from last year, while music manager–record producer Rick Bonadio and singer–actress Luiza Possi joined the judging panel as replacements for Luiz Calainho and Paula Lima who left at the end of season five.

This season had the youngest matchups of the two finalists, Henrique Lemes and Higor Rocha, who were both 16 at the time.

Henrique Lemes won the competition with Higor Rocha as the first runner-up and Hellen Caroline finishing third. The final result was leaked on the show's website circa 30 minutes before the live official announcement and pointed to Henrique's victory with 55% out of a total of 7 million votes cast.

Early Process

Regional Auditions

Auditions were held in the following cities:

During this stage guest judges filled in a special fourth judging seat.

São Paulo Week

Chorus Line
The first day of São Paulo Week featured the eighty-nine contestants from the auditions round. Divided into groups, the contestants go up on stage and individually sing a song a capella. Fifty-two advanced.

Groups
The fifty-two remaining contestants were divided in groups of four or three. They had to pick a song and sing accompanied by a soundtrack. Thirty-one advanced.

Solos
The thirty-one remaining contestants had to choose a music and singing accompanied by a band and can also play an instrument. In the end, the judges take the contestants individually and tell them if they made the final fifteen.

Semi-finals

Semi-finalists
The fifteen semi-finalists were officially announced on May 12, 2011. The following are semi-finalists who failed to reach the finals.

(ages stated at time of contest)

Top 15 – Sing Your Idol

The fifteen semi-finalists performed live on May 17, 2011 with results show on the following episode which aired May 19, 2011. The 5 singers with the highest percentage of the public vote were automatically qualified for the finals. Later on night, the judges decided which 5 out of the remaining 10 semi-finalists completed the Top 10.

Finals

Finalists

The ten finalists were officially announced on May 19, 2011, after the semi-final round results be revealed.

(ages stated at time of contest)

Top 10 – Country

 Guest Judge: Paula Fernandes

Top 9 – Hit Songs

 Guest Judge: Restart

Men sing hits from female singers and women sing hits from male singers.

Top 8 – Cheesy Night

 Guest Judge: Falcão

Two contestants were eliminated this week.

Top 6 – Potpourri

 Guest Judge: Marcos & Belutti

Top 5 – Public Choice / Brazilian Charts

 Guest Judge: Fernando & Sorocaba

Each contestant sang two songs.

Top 4 – Pop Rock

 Guest Judge: Capital Inicial

Each contestant sang one solo and one duet with a fellow contestant.

Top 3 – Judge's Choice

Each contestant sang three songs chosen by: Luiza Possi (1st round), Rick Bonadio (2nd round) and Marco Camargo (3rd round).

Top 2 – Winner's Single 1, Season's Best and Winner's Single 2

Each contestant sang three songs.

Elimination chart

Results Night Performances

References

External links
 Ídolos Brazil website

2011 Brazilian television seasons
Ídolos (Brazilian TV series)